КаriZма was a Bulgarian pop duo, whose members were Galina Kurdova (Galya) and Miroslav Kostadinov (Miro).

Biography 

Galya and Miro started singing together in a piano bar named Opera. In the documentary КаriZma Retrospective Movie they said that they had decided to work together, because their voices matched each other. One of the first proposals for a name was 2Good4U, but Galya rejected it.

The beginning of the duet КариZма was in 1999. They worked for non-Bulgarian music companies, such as EMA, TOCO int. and others. Two years later the famous Bulgarian music composer Mitko Shterev helped them with their first single, Riskuvam da te imam (I risk to have you). Before the release of the single Kolko mi lipsvash ("How much I miss you") in 2002, KariZma worked with other performers, like Toni, Maria Ilieva, Santra, Spens, Ava, Irra, etc. This delayed the work on their debut album. Moreover, on March 13, 2006, Galya entered the VIP Brother 1 House, where she stayed for 18 days. Their next hits were Shte izbiagam li ot teb?("Will I run away from you?") (2003), Mr. Killer (2004), and Minavash prez men ("You pass through me") (2005).

In 2006, they released their first album, Eklisiast.

Biggest hits 
Рискувам да те имам (Riskuvam da te imam)- I am risking to have you
Колко ми липсваш (Kolko mi lipsvash) - How much I miss you
Ще избягам ли от теб? (Shte izbiagam li ot teb?)- Will I run away from you
Mr.Killer
Минаваш през мен (Minavash prez men)- You walk through me
All In Love (Izciqlo vuv liubov)
Някога преди (Niakoga predi)- Sometime before

Albums 
Еклисиаст - Eklisiast

References

External links
 КариZма in hit.bg

Bulgarian musical groups